The gens Tetrinia was an obscure plebeian family at ancient Rome.  Almost no members of this gens are mentioned in history, but several are known from inscriptions.

Members

 Tetrinius, whom Suetonius describes as a brigand, was demanded by the crowd at the arena during the reign of Caligula.  The emperor derided those who called for his appearance, describing them all as Tetrinii.
 Tetrinia P. Ɔ. l. Ammia, a freedwoman named in an inscription from Narbo in Gallia Narbonensis, along with Numerius Vibius Rufus.
 Publius Tetrinius P. f. Amphio, named along with the freedman Lucius Cornelius Neo, in an inscription from Thessalonica in Macedonia, dating from the middle or late first century BC.
 Gnaeus Tetrinius Cn. f. Atticus, buried at Rome, along with the freedmen Titus Didius Hector and Titus Didius Boethus, and the freedwoman Didia Chreste.
 Gnaeus Tetrinius Hilarus, together with Sextus Flavius Zmaragdus, built a tomb at Rome for Flavia Primigenia.

See also
 List of Roman gentes

References

Bibliography
 Gaius Suetonius Tranquillus, De Vita Caesarum (Lives of the Caesars, or The Twelve Caesars).
 Theodor Mommsen et alii, Corpus Inscriptionum Latinarum (The Body of Latin Inscriptions, abbreviated CIL), Berlin-Brandenburgische Akademie der Wissenschaften (1853–present).
 René Cagnat et alii, L'Année épigraphique (The Year in Epigraphy, abbreviated AE), Presses Universitaires de France (1888–present).
 Paul von Rohden, Elimar Klebs, & Hermann Dessau, Prosopographia Imperii Romani (The Prosopography of the Roman Empire, abbreviated PIR), Berlin (1898).

Roman gentes